Inés Pertiné Urien (born 27 December 1942) is an Argentine public figure and widow of former President Fernando de la Rúa. She served as First Lady of Argentina from 1999 until 2001. She also held the position of  First Lady of Buenos Aires, the country's capital city, from 1996 to 1999.

Pertiné, the daughter of María Celia Urien Irigoyen and Julio Jorge Pertiné, was born on 27 December 1942. She attended colegio Asunción, which is now called San Martín de Tours. Pertiné married Fernando de la Rúa, a lawyer and politician, on 1 December 1970, after dating for three years. She was 27 years old at the time, while he was 33. The couple had three children, Antonio, Fernando and Agustina.

References

Living people
1942 births
First ladies and gentlemen of Argentina
People from Buenos Aires